The 2001 Women's Oceania Cup was the second edition of the women's field hockey tournament. It was held from 26 to 29 July in Auckland, Hamilton and Wellington.

The tournament served as a qualifier for the 2002 FIH World Cup.

Australia won the tournament for the second time, defeating New Zealand in the three–game series, 3–0. However, as Australia had already qualified for the FIH World Cup as the host nation, the entry quota was awarded to New Zealand.

Results
All times are local (NZST).

Pool

Fixtures

Statistics

Final standings

Goalscorers

References

2001
2001 in women's field hockey
2001 in New Zealand women's sport
2001 Oceania Cup
July 2001 sports events in New Zealand